The Basketball Federation of Ukraine also known as FBU is the governing body of basketball in Ukraine. It was founded and joined FIBA in 1992, after the dissolution of the Soviet Union. The federation is headquartered in Kyiv.

The Basketball Federation of Ukraine operates the Ukraine men's national team and Ukraine women's national team. They organize national competitions in Ukraine, for both the men's and women's senior teams and also the youth national basketball teams.

The top professional league in Ukraine is the Ukrainian Basketball SuperLeague.

See also 
Ukraine national basketball team
Ukraine women's national basketball team
Ukraine national under-19 basketball team
Ukraine national under-17 basketball team
Ukraine men's national 3x3 team

References

External links 
Official website 
Ukraine at FIBA site

Basketball
Fed
Basketball governing bodies in Europe
Sports organizations established in 1992